Bineesh Thottunkal Balan (born 1 January 1989) is an Indian footballer who plays for FC Thrissur.

Career

Early career
Bineesh started his career very early at his school days playing for Panampally Nagar School, Ernakulam and winning a lot of awards and appreciations. He represented his district Thrissur and Kerala at sub junior levels.

He made a lot of good performances at Tata Football Academy after joining them in 2004. He was top scorer in the JRD Cup, Jharkhand League and many more competitions and has captained the academy. He managed to score an impressive 19 goals from 7 matches in Jharkhand League for TFA.

This consistent performances led him to the Goan giants Churchill Brothers S.C. who captured him in 2009.

He has represented India U14 and India U19 levels and has played in many major tournaments like Wales International Soccer Tournament, England and has scored against the youth teams of Tottenham Hotspur F.C. and Airhot United.

Churchill Brothers
Balan started his career with Churchill Brothers during the I-League 2010-11 season. That season he played in 12 matches while scoring in six of them.

References

External links
 
 Bineesh Balan at goal.com

Indian footballers
I-League players
Footballers from Thrissur
Living people
Churchill Brothers FC Goa players
1989 births
India youth international footballers
Association football forwards